L'Ami du peuple (The Friend of the People) was a newspaper written by Jean-Paul Marat during the French Revolution. "The most celebrated radical paper of the Revolution", according to historian Jeremy D. Popkin, L’Ami du peuple was a vocal advocate for the rights of the lower classes and was an outspoken critic against those Marat believed to be enemies of the people, which he had no hesitation mentioning in his writings. These papers were considered dangerous because they often ignited violent and rebellious behavior.

Inception

As an elector for the District of the Carmes Déchaussés in 1789, Marat tried to persuade the electoral assembly to publish a journal to keep their electorate informed of current political events. When they did not take up his proposal, Marat resigned his post as elector in order to concentrate on writing a journal himself, at first entitled Le Publiciste parisien. The first issue was published 12 September 1789. After several issues, the name was changed to L’Ami du peuple.

Early struggles

The journal was printed in octavo format, and was usually eight pages long, although occasionally expanding to twelve or sixteen pages. Marat ordinarily published L’Ami du Peuple on a daily basis, but there are several gaps in its publication due to Marat’s several times going into hiding to avoid arrest, during which he did not print his journal. His continual attacks against Jacques Necker, Jean Sylvain Bailly, the comte de Mirabeau, the Paris Commune, the marquis de Lafayette, the National Constituent Assembly, the Legislative Assembly, the National Convention, the émigrés, and King Louis XVI himself caused several decrees of outlawry and accusation against him and attempts to suppress his journal. His press was destroyed and copies of L’Ami du peuple confiscated at least twice. On one occasion his printer was arrested and imprisoned, and the plates used to print an especially controversial issue—in which he threatened to tear out the heart of Lafayette, burn the King, and impale the deputies of the Assembly upon their seats—were destroyed.

Marat, with no source of independent income, used much of his own savings to print L’Ami du peuple. In early 1792, after returning from a two-month stay in England, he could not afford to continue the journal. With the financial support of his new common-law wife, Simone Evrard, he was able to renew publication. After the suspension of the monarchy  on August 10, 1792, the Committee of Police and Surveillance of the Paris Commune gave Marat four of the royal presses, and the new imprimerie de Marat was set up in the basement of the Convent of the Cordeliers.

Marat's time in National Convention

On September 9, 1792, Marat was elected to the National Convention. On September 25, he began a new journal entitled Journal de la République française. In April 1793, the Girondists passed a law (later repealed) making it illegal for members of the Convention to be at the same time legislators and journalists; in response, Marat changed the name of his journal again—this time to Publiciste de la Révolution française—claiming to be a publicist, not a journalist. It would continue under this name until his death.

Marat resigned from the Convention on June 3, 1793, after the overthrow of the Girondists was complete. His skin disease was now accompanied by a lung complaint, and he spent much of his time in a medicinal bath. His journal during this time consists mostly of letters from his many correspondents. On July 13, Marat was murdered by Charlotte Corday; the last edition of his journal was published the day after his death.

Impact and influence

In all, Marat's L’Ami du peuple ran to nearly seven hundred issues, and the journal he began at his election to the Convention ran to nearly two hundred and fifty issues, in addition to his many other pamphlets. The popularity of his paper led to many counterfeits during his periods of hiding (by those in sympathy with his views and those wishing to misrepresent him) and after his death. His incendiary journalism is credited with playing a significant role in the Women's March on Versailles in October 1789, the suspension of the monarchy on August 10, 1792, the September Massacres and inciting other actions of the revolutionary crowd.

In Marat's own words

Marat describes the start and evolution of his journal (alongside his political views) in his journal of March 19, 1793:

At the outbreak of the Revolution, wearied by the persecutions that I had experienced for so long a time at the hands of the Academy of Sciences, I eagerly embraced the occasion that presented itself of defeating my oppressors and attaining my proper position. I came to the Revolution with my ideas already formed, and I was so familiar with the principles of high politics that they had become commonplaces for me. Having had greater confidence in the mock patriots of the Constituent Assembly than they deserved, I was surprised at their pettiness, their lack of virtue. Believing that they needed light, I entered into correspondence with the most famous deputies, notably with Chapelier, Mirabeau, and Barnave. Their stubborn silence on all my letters soon proved to me that though they needed light, they cared little to be enlightened. I adopted the course of publishing my ideas by means of the press. I founded the Ami du Peuple. I began it with a severe but honest tone, that of a man who wishes to tell the truth without breaking the conventions of society. I maintained that tone for two whole months. Disappointed in finding that it did not produce the entire effect that I had expected, and indignant that the boldness of the unfaithful representatives of the people and of the lying public officials was steadily increasing, I felt that it was necessary to renounce moderation and to substitute satire and irony for simple censure. The bitterness of the satire increased with the number of mismanagements, the iniquity of their projects and the public misfortunes. Strongly convinced of the absolute perversity of the supporters of the old regime and the enemies of liberty, I felt that nothing could be obtained from them except by force. Revolted by their attempts, by their ever-recurrent plots, I realized that no end would be put to these except by exterminating the ones guilty of them. Outraged at seeing the representatives of the nation in league with its deadliest enemies and the laws serving only to tyrannize over the innocent whom they ought to have protected, I recalled to the sovereign people that since they had nothing more to expect from their representatives, it behooved them to mete out justice for themselves. This was done several times.

Notes

References
Gottschalk, Louis R. (1927, reissued 1966). Jean-Paul Marat: A Study in Radicalism, Benjamin Bloom.
Darnton, Robert and Roche, Daniel, editors. (1989). Revolution in Print: the Press in France, 1775-1800, University of California Press.
Belfort Bax, Ernest (1901). Jean-Paul Marat, The People’s Friend, Grant Richards.

External links
 Marxists.org Marat Archive Collection of excerpts from L'Ami du peuple and Marat's other journals.
 Marat dit l'ami du peuple Volumes on HathiTrust Digital Library
 L'ami du peuple, ou, Le publiciste parisien Volumes on HathiTrust Digital Library

1789 establishments in France
Defunct newspapers published in France
Newspapers of the French Revolution
Publications established in 1789
Publications disestablished in 1792
1793 disestablishments in France